Authier-Nord is a municipality in northwestern Quebec, Canada, in the Abitibi-Ouest Regional County Municipality.

The municipality was formed on January 1, 1983, when it partially separated from the Parish Municipality of Macamic.

Demographics

Population

Language

Municipal council
 Mayor: Alain Gagnon
 Councillors: Léopold Bergeron, Noëlla Dubé, Lorrie Gagnon, Cécile Hélie, Denis St-Georges, Jean-Yves Sylvestre

See also
 List of municipalities in Quebec

References

Municipalities in Quebec
Incorporated places in Abitibi-Témiscamingue
Populated places established in 1983